William Kristol (born December 23, 1952) is an American neoconservative writer.<ref>*
;
;
;
;
{{cite news|last =Gawenda|first =Michael|title =Neoconservatives despair over US persistence with diplomacy|work =The Sydney Morning Herald|date =2006-07-24|url =http://www.smh.com.au/news/opinion/neoconservatives-despair-over-us-persistence-with-diplomacy/2006/07/23/1153593209669.html|access-date =2010-08-18|quote =Kristol is a leading neoconservative and The Weekly Standard'''s list of contributing editors is a virtual who's who of the movement's leading thinkers and proselytisers|archive-date =September 24, 2015|archive-url =https://web.archive.org/web/20150924203032/http://www.smh.com.au/news/opinion/neoconservatives-despair-over-us-persistence-with-diplomacy/2006/07/23/1153593209669.html|url-status =live}}</ref> A frequent commentator on several networks including CNN, he was the founder and editor-at-large of the political magazine The Weekly Standard. Kristol is now editor-at-large of the center-right publication The Bulwark.

A founder and director of the advocacy organization Defending Democracy Together — responsible for such projects as Republicans for the Rule of Law, Republican Voters Against Trump and Republicans Against Putin — he is also known for playing the leading role in the defeat of President Bill Clinton's health care plan and advocating the U.S. invasion of Iraq. Kristol is a critic of former president Donald Trump.

Kristol, an avid "Never Trumper", has been associated with a number of conservative think tanks. He was chairman of the New Citizenship Project from 1997 to 2005. In 1997, he co-founded the Project for the New American Century (PNAC) with Robert Kagan. He is a member of the board of trustees for the free-market Manhattan Institute for Policy Research, a member of the Policy Advisory Board for the Ethics and Public Policy Center, and a director of the Foreign Policy Initiative. He is also one of the three board members of Keep America Safe, a national-security think tank co-founded by Liz Cheney and Debra Burlingame, and serves on the boards of the Emergency Committee for Israel and of the Susan B. Anthony List (as of 2010). He has featured in a web program of the Foundation for Constitutional Government, Conversations with Bill Kristol, since 2014.

Early life and education

William Kristol was born on December 23, 1952, in New York City, into a Jewish family, the son of Irving Kristol and Gertrude Himmelfarb. Irving Kristol was an editor and publisher who served as the managing editor of Commentary magazine, founded the magazine The Public Interest, and was described by Jonah Goldberg as the "godfather of neoconservatism."  Gertrude Himmelfarb was a prominent conservative historian, especially of intellectual history in the U.S. and Great Britain.

Kristol attended Collegiate School for Boys in Manhattan. He received a bachelor's degree at Harvard University and, from there, a Ph.D. in political science (1979).

Career

In the summer of 1970, Kristol was an intern at the White House. In 1976, Kristol worked for Daniel Patrick Moynihan's United States Senate campaign, serving as deputy issues director during the Democratic primary. In 1988, he was the campaign manager for Alan Keyes's unsuccessful Maryland Senatorial campaign against Paul Sarbanes.

After teaching political philosophy and U.S. politics at the University of Pennsylvania and Harvard's Kennedy School of Government, Kristol went to work in government in 1985, serving as chief of staff to United States secretary of education William Bennett during the Reagan administration, and later, as chief of staff to the vice president under Dan Quayle in the George H. W. Bush administration. The New Republic dubbed Kristol "Dan Quayle's brain" when he was appointed the vice president's chief of staff.

He served as chairman of the Project for the Republican Future from 1993 to 1994, and as the director of the Bradley Project at the Bradley Foundation in Milwaukee in 1993. In 1993, he led conservative opposition to the Clinton health care plan of 1993.

In 2003, Kristol and Lawrence F. Kaplan wrote The War Over Iraq: America's Mission and Saddam's Tyranny (ISBN), in which the authors analyzed the Bush Doctrine and the history of Iraqi-U.S. relations. In the book, Kristol and Kaplan provided support and justifications for the 2003 invasion of Iraq.

He also served as a foreign policy advisor for Senator John McCain's presidential campaign.

Media commentator
After the Republican sweep of both houses of Congress in 1994, Kristol established, along with John Podhoretz, the conservative news magazine The Weekly Standard. Rupert Murdoch, chairman and managing director of News Corp., financed its creation.

Beginning in 1996, Kristol was a panelist on the ABC Sunday news program This Week. Following declining ratings, his contract was not renewed three years later.

Kristol was a columnist for Time in 2007. The following year, he joined The New York Times as a columnist. Several days after he did so, Times public editor Clark Hoyt called his hiring "a mistake," due to Kristol's assertion in 2006 that the Times should potentially be prosecuted for having revealed information about the Terrorist Finance Tracking Program. Kristol wrote a weekly opinion column for The New York Times from January 7, 2008, to January 26, 2009.

For ten years, Kristol was a regular panelist on Fox News Sunday and often contributed to the nightly program Special Report with Bret Baier. In 2013, his contract with Fox News expired, and he became a much sought after commentator on several networks. It was announced on This Week with George Stephanopoulos on February 2, 2014, that Kristol would be a contributor for ABC News and to that program.

Since the summer of 2014, Kristol has also hosted an online interview program, Conversations with Bill Kristol, featuring guests from academic and public life.

 Political views 
Kristol was key to the defeat of the Clinton health care plan of 1993. In the first of what would become many strategy memos written for Republican policymakers, Kristol said the party should "kill," not amend, President Clinton's health care plan. A later memorandum used the phrase "There is no health care crisis," which Senate Minority Leader Bob Dole used in his response to Clinton's 1994 State of the Union address.

Kristol was a leading proponent of the Iraq War. In 1998, he joined other foreign policy analysts in sending a letter to President Clinton urging a stronger posture against Iraq. Kristol argued that Saddam Hussein posed a grave threat to the United States and its allies: "The only acceptable strategy is one that eliminates the possibility that Iraq will be able to use or threaten to use weapons of mass destruction. In the near term, this means a willingness to undertake military action as diplomacy is clearly failing. In the long term, it means removing Saddam Hussein and his regime from power. That now needs to become the aim of American foreign policy." In 1998 he and Robert Kagan wrote a New York Times piece where they said "bombing Iraq isn't enough" and called on Clinton to invade the country.

In the 2000 presidential election, Kristol supported John McCain. Answering a question from a PBS reporter about the Republican primaries, he said, "No. I had nothing against Governor Bush. I was inclined to prefer McCain. The reason I was inclined to prefer McCain was his leadership on foreign policy."

After the Bush administration developed its response to the September 11, 2001 attacks, Kristol said: "We've just been present at a very unusual moment, the creation of a new American foreign policy." Kristol ardently supported the Bush administration's decision to go to war with Iraq. In 2003, he and Lawrence Kaplan wrote The War Over Iraq, in which he described reasons for removing Saddam. Kristol rejected comparisons to Vietnam and predicted a "two-month war, not an eight-year war" during a March 28 C-SPAN appearance.

As the military situation in Iraq began to deteriorate in 2004, Kristol argued for an increase in the number of U.S. troops in Iraq. He also wrote an op-ed strongly criticizing United States secretary of defense Donald Rumsfeld, saying he "breezily dodged responsibility" for planning mistakes made in the Iraq War, including insufficient troop levels. In September 2006, he and fellow commentator Rich Lowry wrote, "There is no mystery as to what can make the crucial difference in the battle of Baghdad: American troops."

This was one of the early calls for what became the Iraq War troop surge of 2007 four months later. In December 2008, Kristol wrote that the surge was "opposed at the time by the huge majority of foreign policy experts, pundits, and pontificators," but that "most of them — and the man most of them are happy won the election, Barack Obama — now acknowledge the surge's success."

Kristol was one of many conservatives to publicly oppose Bush's second U.S. Supreme Court nominee, Harriet Miers. "I'm disappointed, depressed, and demoralized," he said of Miers. "It is very hard to avoid the conclusion that President Bush flinched from a fight on constitutional philosophy. Miers is undoubtedly a decent and competent person. But her selection will unavoidably be judged as reflecting a combination of cronyism and capitulation on the part of the president."

He was a vocal supporter of the 2006 Lebanon War, stating that the war is "our war too," referring to the United States.

Kristol was an ardent promoter of Sarah Palin, advocating for her selection as the running mate of John McCain in the 2008 United States presidential election months before McCain chose her. However, he later recanted his support for her, saying: "I'm perfectly willing to say that given what I now know about her, she would not have been a good vice president."Chotiner, Isaac (December 22, 2017). Was Palin the Harbinger of Trump?  Slate.

In response to Iran's nuclear program, Kristol has supported strong sanctions. In June 2006, at the height of the Lebanon War, he suggested: "We might consider countering this act of Iranian aggression with a military strike against Iranian nuclear facilities. Why wait?"

In 2010, Kristol criticized the Obama administration and Joint Chiefs of Staff chairman Admiral Mike Mullen for an unserious approach to Iran. He wrote: "The real question is what form of instability would be more dangerous — that caused by this Iranian government with nuclear weapons, or that caused by attacking this government's nuclear weapons program. It's time to have a serious debate about the choice between these two kinds of destabilization, instead of just refusing to confront the choice."

In the 2010 affair surrounding the disclosure of U.S. diplomatic cables by WikiLeaks, Kristol spoke strongly against the organization and suggested using "our various assets to harass, snatch, or neutralize Julian Assange and his collaborators, wherever they are." In March 2011, he wrote an editorial in The Weekly Standard arguing that the United States' military interventions in Muslim countries (including the Gulf War, the Kosovo War, the War in Afghanistan, and the Iraq War) should not be classified as "invasions," but rather as "liberations." Kristol backed President Barack Obama's decision to intervene in the Libyan Civil War in 2011 and urged fellow conservatives to support the action.

 Opposition to Donald Trump 

Kristol vehemently opposed the nomination of Donald Trump as the Republican candidate for president in 2016. He has continued to express animosity towards Trump's domestic and foreign policy aims, and dismay at conservative Republicans who have accommodated themselves to the Trump administration.

In January 2019, Kristol criticized President Trump's planned withdrawal of U.S. troops from Syria and Afghanistan. On December 21, Kristol and a group calling itself Republicans for the Rule of Law released an ad encouraging viewers to call their Senators to demand top Trump officials be forced to testify in his impeachment trial.

In March 2020, Kristol endorsed former U.S. vice president Joe Biden for President of the United States. Kristol is founding director of Republican Voters Against Trump, a project of Defending Democracy Together, launched in May 2020. On October 15, Kristol voted for the Democratic ticket. He stated "Just filled out my early absentee ballot in VA for Joe Biden & Kamala Harris, Mark Warner, and Jennifer Wexton. No regrets at all about this."

Kristol did an interview with Jewish Insider in 2021 where he said that he identifies as more of a former Republican.

Personal life
Since 1975, Kristol has been married to Susan Scheinberg, whom he met while they were both students at Harvard. Scheinberg holds a Ph.D. in classics. The couple has three children. Their daughter, Anne, is married to writer Matthew Continetti, editor-in-chief of The Washington Free Beacon website. Their son, Joseph, served in the U.S. Marine Corps in Afghanistan and worked for the management consulting company McKinsey & Company before taking a job as legislative director for Senator Tom Cotton in 2018.Delia Pais and Joseph Kristol  February 16, 2014, New York Times Kristol lives in McLean, Virginia.

Published works
 The Weekly Standard: A Reader: 1995-2005 (Harper Perennial, 2006). 
 War Over Iraq: Saddam's Tyranny And America's Mission (Co-author Lawrence F. Kaplan) (Encounter Books, 2003). 
 Bush v. Gore: The Court Cases and the Commentary (Co-editor E. J. Dionne) (Brookings Institution Press, 2001). 
 Homosexuality and American Public Life (Introduction by Kristol, Editor Christopher Wolfe) (Spence Publishing Company, 1999). 

 References 

 Sources 
 Johnson, Haynes and Broder, David. The System: the American way of politics at the breaking point. Boston: Little, Brown & Company, 1996.
 Current Biography Yearbook, 1997.
 Nina Easton, Gang of Five, Simon & Schuster, 2002.

External links

 Biography and column archive at The Weekly Standard''
 Biography at the Project for the New American Century
 
 
 C-SPAN Q&A interview with Kristol, April 9, 2006
 
 Conversations with Bill Kristol

1952 births
Living people
American columnists
American magazine editors
American magazine founders
American male non-fiction writers
American people of Russian-Jewish descent
American political commentators
American political writers
American speechwriters
American Zionists
Carnegie Council for Ethics in International Affairs
Chiefs of Staff to the Vice President of the United States
CNN people
Collegiate School (New York) alumni
Criticism of Donald Trump
Harvard College alumni
Jewish American writers
Harvard Kennedy School faculty
Manhattan Institute for Policy Research
Neoconservatism
People from McLean, Virginia
Reagan administration personnel
The American Spectator people
The New York Times columnists
The Weekly Standard people
University of Pennsylvania faculty
Virginia Democrats
Virginia Republicans
Writers from New York City